Lindenbergia muraria, synonym Lindenbergia urticifolia, is a flowering plant in the family Orobanchaceae, native from Ethiopia to south China and Indo-China. It is a common plant throughout India.

It has a faint aromatic odour and a slightly bitter taste, and has been used to treat skin problems and bronchitis.

References

muraria
Flora of Ethiopia
Flora of Oman
Flora of Afghanistan
Flora of tropical Asia
Medicinal plants of Asia